Aktel (Ak-Ĵul) is a rural locality (a selo) and the administrative centre of Aktelskoye Rural Settlement, Shebalinsky District, the Altai Republic, Russia. The population was 344 as of 2016. There are 3 streets.

Geography 
Aktel is located 37 km north of Shebalino (the district's administrative centre) by road. Barlak and Kamay are the nearest rural localities.

References 

Rural localities in Shebalinsky District